The white-cheeked tody-flycatcher (Poecilotriccus albifacies) is a species of bird in the family Tyrannidae. It was formerly placed in the genus Todirostrum, and known as the white-cheeked tody-tyrant.

It is endemic to humid bamboo thickets in south-eastern Peru, but stray individuals have been sighted in Bolivia.

References

white-cheeked tody-flycatcher
Birds of the Peruvian Amazon
white-cheeked tody-flycatcher
Taxonomy articles created by Polbot